The West Riding County Women's Football League is an open aged (16 plus) Women's Association Football League in England affiliated to the West Riding FA.

The Charter Standard League is run by a number of League Officials who are annually voted in by the member clubs spread across its 5 Divisions.

The League is at levels 7 to 10 of the Women's Football League Pyramid, and promotes to the North East Regional Women's Football League.

2019/20 Season 
The season was brought to an abrupt end by the outbreak of the global pandemic COVID-19 and was declared null and void.

League leaders at the time Farsley Celtic Juniors Firsts were successful in their application for promotion to the next step of the Women's Football League Pyramid - The North East Regional Women's Football League, Harrogate Railway were relegated from Regional to the Premier Division.

Durkar Devils folded & Middleton Athletic departed the League for a more local competition.

Hemsworth Town, Sherburn White Rose & Leeds United added additional teams to the League, Leeds Union University added 2 teams when the University Leagues had opted not to run in 2020/21 & several new teams, Golcar United, Hall Green United, Hepworth United Development, Leeds Hyde Park, Old Centralians entered the League bringing the need for a Third Division to be reactivated to accommodate 42 teams.

Unfortunately Sherburn White Rose Reserves shortly after the start of the season 2020/21.

League & Cup history

References

External links
FA Full-time site

7